Mark "Larko" Larkham (born 29 December 1963 in Griffith) is a retired Australian racing driver, former racing team owner and television commentator.

Open wheelers

Mark Larkham's first impressions on the national racing spotlight was finishing fifth in the 1988 Motorcraft Formula Ford Driver to Europe Series. The following year with the support of the front running Coffey Ford team, Larkham won the 1989 series creating an early rivalry with Russell Ingall. This was highlighted by their first corner clash at Mallala where Larkham and Ingall collided.

Forming his own Larkham Motor Sport team, Larkham made a brief attempt at running a Ford EA Falcon in the 1991 Australian Production Car Championship and returned to open-wheelers at the wheel of a Ralt RT20 in Formula Brabham. In his first season Larkham finished third in the 1991 Australian Drivers' Championship and was the only driver to take a win away from Mark Skaife. The following year Larkham imported a Reynard 90D, the first driver to exploit the relaxation of Formula Brabham rules which had previously prevented cars constructed of carbon-fibre. It was not enough to defeat Skaife however and Larkham ended runner up.

In 1993 Larkham again raced head-to-head with Skaife, now also sporting a carbon-fibre car, and again Larkham lost the title to Skaife. Larkham did however claim Formula Brabham's first international event, the 1993 Indonesian Grand Prix.

Touring cars
Larkham's first foray into touring car racing came at the 1989 Pepsi 300 at the Oran Park Raceway in Sydney where he was to co-drive a  Ford Sierra RS500 with nine time Bathurst winner Peter Brock. Brock qualified the car on pole, but Larkham didn't get to drive as the car was retired with a suspected blown head gasket after only 13 of the 100 laps. Larkham stayed with the Mobil 1 Racing team for the 1989 .05 – 500 at Sandown where he was to drive the team's second Sierra alongside Brad Jones. After Brock's own car again failed to finish (after leading the first third of the race), the team boss joined Jones and Larkham in the #105 car, going on to finish 7th outright. Larkham missed a place in the team for that years Tooheys 1000 at Bathurst when the team was joined by British Sierra expert Andy Rouse. The Brock team had switched to Sierra's at the start of 1989 using car's purchased from Rouse with part of the deal being that the multiple BTCC winner would be Brock's co-driver at Bathurst. Co-driving with Jones in the car Larkham drove at Sandown was young Kiwi hotshot Paul Radisich who unlike Larkham had previous Bathurst experience. Larkham would not make his Bathurst debut for another 6 years.

Larkham spent the next four years driving Formula Holden/Brabham before spending 1994 out of the sport. Larkham's team then stepped into 5.0L Touring Cars in 1995 with a Ford EF Falcon using an innovative car design, bringing their open wheel experience and principles to touring car racing, though the team had a troubled season and failed to score a single point. Some of their innovations spread across the sport however. The team gradually improved, a highlight was third place at the 1997 Primus 1000 Classic at Bathurst, working themselves into a position where it could attract international quality co-drivers. By 1998 much of vehicle preparation was being handled by Stone Brothers Racing, promoting Larkham into a race winning combination, the win finally coming at the 1998 Surfers Paradise Indycar event. 1999 continued improved performances with Larkham taking pole position at the Bathurst 1000. During this time Larkham also first served on the board of TEGA.

In 2003 the team expanded to a second car with 2000 Bathurst 1000 winner Jason Bargwanna taking on lead driving role. Larkham scaled back his driving involvement with 2003 V8 Development Series winner Mark Winterbottom taking Larkham's place as full-time driver. Larkham's final racing drive was at the 2004 Bathurst 1000. After the 2005 season Larkham Motor Sport was sold into the WPS Racing, with Larkham taking over team management role with WPS, however this did not last the season and Larkham retired from the sport.

Television

Larkham returned to the sport as part of Channel 7's television broadcast coverage of V8 Supercar. Larkham has been used as their on air technical guru, explaining to the wider audience V8 Supercar's intricacies. Larkham also acts as one of the pit reporters during the races. Larkham also acts as frequent guest and occasional co-host with Neil Crompton and Mark Skaife of V8 Xtra program.

For 2015, the television rights for V8 Supercars moved from Channel 7 to a split deal between Network Ten and Foxtel, and Larkham moved from Channel 7 to Network Ten. He remains involved with their V8 Supercars coverage along with Matt White, as well as being a specialist on the motorsports panel show RPM

Larkham also serves on the board of the Australian Institute for Motor Sport Safety.

Career results

Complete Bathurst 1000 results

References

1963 births
Australian Touring Car Championship drivers
Formula Ford drivers
Formula Holden drivers
Living people
Motorsport announcers
People from Benalla
Racing drivers from Victoria (Australia)
Supercars Championship drivers
Stone Brothers Racing drivers